Mihaela Melinte (born 27 March 1975 in Bacău) is a Romanian hammer thrower. She holds the world junior record, and with 76.07 metres she held the world record until Tatyana Lysenko beat it in July 2005. The twelve-time Romanian national champion, Melinte is also a former European and World champion, but has never participated in the Olympics.

She failed a drugs test at the Notturna di Milano meeting in 2000 (ruling her out of the 2000 Sydney Olympics) and she was banned from the sport for two years for taking nandrolone (an anabolic steroid). Following her ban, she never again reached a major global podium or threw over 72 metres – some way off her previous world record mark.

She took second place in the women's hammer at the 2005 European Cup Winter Throwing, but was less successful at the 2006 edition, where she finished eleventh overall. She finished fourth in both the 2007 and 2008 European Cup Winter Throwing events. She was the bronze medallist at the 2005 Jeux de la Francophonie.

Achievements

See also
List of doping cases in athletics

References

hammerthrow.wz

Romanian female hammer throwers
1975 births
Living people
Doping cases in athletics
Sportspeople from Bacău
Romanian sportspeople in doping cases
World record setters in athletics (track and field)
World Athletics Championships medalists
European Athletics Championships medalists
Universiade medalists in athletics (track and field)
Goodwill Games medalists in athletics
Universiade gold medalists for Romania
World Athletics Championships winners
Medalists at the 1997 Summer Universiade
Medalists at the 1999 Summer Universiade
Competitors at the 1998 Goodwill Games
20th-century Romanian women
21st-century Romanian women